Richard Sams (1864 – 5 March 1933) was an Australian cricketer. He played two first-class matches for Tasmania between 1893 and 1905.

See also
 List of Tasmanian representative cricketers

References

External links
 

1864 births
1933 deaths
Australian cricketers
Tasmania cricketers
Cricketers from Launceston, Tasmania